Putgarten is a municipality in the Vorpommern-Rügen district, in Mecklenburg-Vorpommern, Germany.

The municipality is managed by the Amt of Nord-Rügen with its seat in Sagard.
Putgarten is the northernmost municipality in the state of Mecklenburg-Vorpommern. It is also the northernmost municipality in what was formerly East Germany. Villages within its boundaries are Arkona, Fernlüttkevitz, Goor, Nobbin, Vitt and Varnkevitz.

References

External links

Official website of Putgarten / Kap Arkona